Yasmine Al Massri is an actress, dancer, video artist and human rights advocate. She was born in Beirut, Lebanon to a Palestinian father and an Egyptian mother. She is a French and American citizen. She made her film debut in the 2007 film Caramel. In 2015, Massri starred as Nimah Amin and Raina Amin, identical twins in the ABC thriller series Quantico.

Early life
She moved to Paris to live and study, and in 2007 graduated from École Nationale supérieure des Beaux-Arts and began her career as a dancer at the Souraya Baghdadi dance company.

Career
Massri made her big screen début in the 2007 critically acclaimed Lebanese LGBT-themed comedy-drama film, Caramel, directed by Nadine Labaki. The film was presented at the 2007 Cannes Film Festival, For Caramel she received the Best Actress Award at the 2007 Abu Dhabi Film Festival, and the same year a Best Actress nomination at the Asia Pacific Screen Awards. Following Caramel, she starred in the internationally produced films Al-mor wa al rumman, Al Juma Al Akheira, and Miral.

In 2014, Massri made her debut on American television, in a starring role on the NBC drama series, Crossbones opposite John Malkovich. In 2015, she was cast alongside Priyanka Chopra and Aunjanue Ellis in the ABC thriller Quantico as two characters — identical twins Nimah and Raina Amin.

In May 2016, Massri became a citizen of the United States.

Filmography

References

External links
 

American film actresses
Lebanese emigrants to France
Lebanese film actresses
Living people
1978 births
Lebanese people of Egyptian descent
Lebanese people of Palestinian descent
Palestinian film actresses
21st-century Palestinian actresses
Palestinian people of Egyptian descent
People with acquired American citizenship
21st-century American women